Junior TV (or smiply Junior) is an Albanian private television network for kids and teenagers between the ages 10–18 years old. It was launched on April 20, 2005 by the TV platform DigitAlb. Junior TV is the second Albanian-language TV channel dedicated to kids after Bang Bang, and it is one of the most watched television channels by pre-teens and teenagers.

Programming

Disney shows
 Austin & Ally (Austin dhe Eli)
 Cory in the House (Kori në shtëpinë e bardhë)
 Even Stevens (Stivensat)
 Good Luck Charlie (Paç fat Çarli)
 Hannah Montana (Hana Montana)
 Jessie (Xhesi)
 Jonas (Xhonas)
 K.C. Undercover (K.C. Agjentja sekrete)
 Liv and Maddie (Liv dhe Medi)
 Lizzie McGuire (Lizi Mekguajer)
 Shake It Up (Kërcim për një ëndërr)
 Sonny with a Chance (Soni mes yjesh)
 That's So Raven (Rejven)
 The Suite Life of Zack & Cody (Jeta në suitë e Zakut dhe Kodit)
 The Suite Life on Deck (Zaku dhe Kodi në anije)
 Violetta (Violeta)
 Wizards of Waverly Place (Magjistarët e sheshit Uejverli)

Nickelodeon shows
 100 Things to Do Before High School (100 gjëra për t'u bërë para gjimnazit)
 Bella and the Bulldogs (Bela dhe Bulldogët)
 Big Time Rush (Big Time Rush: Banda muzikore)
 Every Witch Way (Ema, një shtrigë ëndrrash)
 Game Shakers (Krijuesit e lojrave)
 Henry Danger (I rrezikshmi Henri)
 iCarly (Unë Karli)
 Isa TKM (Isa TDSH)
 Isa TK+ (Isa TDSH, sezoni 2)
 Sam & Cat (Semi dhe Keti)
 School of Rock (Shkolla e rrokut)
 See Dad Run (Në shtëpi me babin)
 Talia in the Kitchen (Talia në kuzhinë)
 The Haunted Hathaways (Shtëpia e fantazmave)
 The Thundermans (Familja Thunderman)
 The Troop (Skuadra Anti-Monstër)
 True Jackson, VP (Tru Xhekson)
 Victorious (Fitimtare)

Other shows
 Balamory (Balamori)
 Being Eve (Të jesh Eva)
 Big Cook, Little Cook (Kuzhinieri i madh dhe kuzhinieri i vogël)
 Brum (Brami)
 Galidor
 Hi-5 (Tjeta-5)
 LazyTown (Qyteti i përtacëve)
 L'Italiano in Famiglia (Italishtja në familje)
 Little Miss Perfect
 Lola...Érase una vez (Na ishte njëherë Lola)
 Make It or Break It (Gjimnastet olimpike)
 Malcolm in the Middle (Malkolmi)
 Patito Feo (Bota e Patit) 
 Popland!
 Sabrina, the Teenage Witch (Sabrina, shtriga adoleshente)
 Suburgatory (Periferia)
 Switched at Birth (Këmbyer në lindje)
 The Fresh Prince of Bel-Air (Princi i Bel-Air)
 The Greenhouse
 The Saddle Club (Klubi i kalorëseve)
 The Simpsons (Simpsonët)
 The Tribe (Tribu)
 Tin Man (Njeriu prej teneqeje)

Original productions
 DigiTime
 Hapa në pasarelë
 Junior Club
 Kompjuteri im
 Little Miss Perfect
 Muzikal në Junior
 Planeti Kripëmjaltëzat
 Prodhime 100% Shqiptare
 Yjet e muzikës
 Super Junior

Movies

 13 Going on 30
 16 Wishes
 101 Dalmatians
 102 Dalmatians
 A Christmas Carol
 A Cinderella Story
 Another Cinderella Story
 A Cinderella Story: Once Upon a Song
 A Kid in King Arthur's Court
 A Kid in Aladdin's Palace
 A Little Princess
 A Princess for Christmas
 A Series of Unfortunate Events
 A Simple Wish
 Agent Cody Banks
 Agent Cody Banks 2: Destination London
 Air Buddies
 Alexander and the Terrible, Horrible, No Good, Very Bad Day
 Alice in Wonderland
 Aliens in the Attic
 All I Want for Christmas
 All Stars
 An American Girl: Chrissa Stands Strong
 An American Girl: Isabelle Dances Into the Spotlight
 An American Girl: McKenna Shoots for the Stars
 An American Girl: Saige Paints the Sky
 Angus, Thongs and Perfect Snogging
 Annie
 Annie: A Royal Adventure!
 Annie Claus is Coming to Town
 Aquamarine
 Are We There Yet?
 Are We Done Yet?
 Around the World in 80 Days
 Asterix & Obelix: Mission Cleopatra
 Asterix & Obelix Take On Caesar
 Asterix at the Olympic Games
 Avalon High
 Babysitters Beware
 Babe
 Baby Geniuses
 Baby's Day Out
 Bad News Bears
 Ballet Shoes
 Bandslam
 Battle for Skyark
 Because of Winn-Dixie
 Bedtime Stories
 Beethoven
 Beethoven's 2nd
 Beethoven's 3rd
 Beethoven's 4th
 Beethoven's 5th
 Belle and Sebastian
 Ben 10: Alien Swarm
 Ben 10: Race Against Time
 Beverly Hills Chihuahua
 Beverly Hills Chihuahua 2
 Beverly Hills Chihuahua 3: Viva la Fiesta!
 Big Daddy
 Big Fat Liar
 Big Miracle
 Big Time Movie
 Billboard Dad
 Billy Madison
 Black Knight
 Blank Check
 Bratz
 Bratz: Starrin' & Stylin'
 Bratz: Rock Angelz
 Bratz: Genie Magic
 Bratz: Forever Diamondz
 Bridge to Terabithia
 Bring It On
 Bring It On Again
 Bring It On: All or Nothing
 Bring It On: In It to Win It
 Bring It On: Fight to the Finish
 Cadet Kelly
 Camp Rock
 Camp Rock 2: The Final Jam
 Campus Confidential
 Casper
 Cats & Dogs
 Cats & Dogs: The Revenge of Kitty Galore
 Chalet Girl
 Charlie and the Chocolate Factory
 Charlie St. Cloud
 Charlotte's Web
 Chasing Liberty
 Cheaper by the Dozen
 Cheaper by the Dozen 2
 Christmas Cupid
 Christmas in Wonderland
 Christmas with the Kranks
 Cloud 9
 Clueless
 Confessions of a Teenage Drama Queen
 Cow Belles
 Cowgirls 'n Angels
 Cowgirls 'n Angels: Dakota's Summer
 Crimes of Fashion
 Crooked Arrows
 Daddy Day Care
 Daddy Day Camp
 Dadnapped
 Dear Dumb Diary
 Deck the Halls
 Demi Lovato: Stay Strong
 Dennis the Menace
 Descendants
 Diary of a Wimpy Kid
 Diary of a Wimpy Kid: Rodrick Rules
 Diary of a Wimpy Kid: Dog Days
 Disney's The Kid
 Dog Gone
 Dolphin Tale
 Dolphin Tale 2
 Don't Look Under the Bed
 Dr. Dolittle
 Dr. Dolittle 2
 Dr. Dolittle 3
 Dr. Dolittle: Tail to the Chief
 Dr. Dolittle: Million Dollar Mutts
 Dragonball Evolution
 Drake & Josh Go Hollywood
 Dreamer
 Drillbit Taylor
 Eight Below
 Elf
 Ella Enchanted
 Elle: A Modern Cinderella Tale
 Eloise at the Plaza
 Eloise at Christmastime
 Enchanted
 Eragon
 E.T. the Extra-Terrestrial
 Ever After
 Family Plan
 Finding Neverland
 Firehouse Dog
 First Dog
 Five Children and It
 Flicka
 Flicka 2
 Flicka: Country Pride
 Flipped
 Flubber
 Frankenweenie
 Freaky Friday
 Fred Claus
 Fred: The Movie
 Fred 2: Night of the Living Fred
 Fred 3: Camp Fred
 Free Style
 Free Willy
 Free Willy 2: The Adventure Home
 Free Willy 3: The Rescue
 Free Willy: Escape from Pirate's Cove
 Frenemies
 From Justin to Kelly
 Fun Size
 Furry Vengeance
 Geek Charming
 George of the Jungle
 George of the Jungle 2
 Get a Clue
 Getting There
 Go Figure
 Good Boy!
 Good Burger
 Gracie
 Gulliver's Travels
 Hairspray
 Halloweentown
 Halloweentown II: Kalabar's Revenge
 Halloweentown High
 Hannah Montana: The Movie
 Hannah Montana and Miley Cyrus: Best of Both Worlds Concert
 Harriet the Spy
 Harriet the Spy: Blog Wars
 Harry Potter and the Philosopher's Stone
 Harry Potter and the Chamber of Secrets
 Harry Potter and the Prisoner of Azkaban
 Harry Potter and the Goblet of Fire
 Harry Potter and the Order of the Phoenix
 Harry Potter and the Half-Blood Prince
 Harry Potter and the Deathly Hallows – Part 1
 Harry Potter and the Deathly Hallows – Part 2
 Hatching Pete
 Hello Sister, Goodbye Life
 The Love Bug
 Herbie Rides Again
 Herbie Goes to Monte Carlo
 Herbie Goes Bananas
 Herbie: Fully Loaded
 High School Musical
 High School Musical 2
 High School Musical 3: Senior Year
 Hocus Pocus
 Holes
 Holiday in the Sun
 Home Alone
 Home Alone 2: Lost in New York
 Home Alone 3
 Home Alone 4
 Honey
 Honey 2
 Honey, I Shrunk the Kids
 Honey, I Blew Up the Kid
 Honey, We Shrunk Ourselves
 Hoot
 Hotel for Dogs
 How the Grinch Stole Christmas
 How to Eat Fried Worms
 Ice Girls
 Ice Princess
 I'll Be Home for Christmas
 Imagine That
 Inkheart
 Inspector Gadget
 Inspector Gadget 2
 Invisible Sister
 iParty with Victorious
 It Takes Two
 Jeremy Fink and the Meaning of Life
 Johnson Family Vacation
 Jonas Brothers: The 3D Concert Experience
 Journey to the Center of the Earth
 Journey 2: The Mysterious Island
 Judy Moody and the Not Bummer Summer
 Jump In!
 Jumanji
 Jurassic Park
 The Lost World: Jurassic Park
 Jurassic Park III
 Just for Kicks
 Just Peck
 Justin Time
 Katy Perry: Part of Me
 Labou
 Lemonade Mouth
 Let It Shine
 Life Is Ruff
 Life-Size
 Lifted
 Like Mike
 Little Manhattan
 Logan
 Look Who's Talking
 Look Who's Talking Too
 Look Who's Talking Now
 Looney Tunes: Back in Action
 Lucky Christmas
 Madeline
 Maleficent
 Man of the House
 Martian Child
 Mary Poppins
 Material Girls
 Matilda
 Matty Hanson and the Invisibility Ray
 Merry Christmas, Drake & Josh
 Minor Details
 Minutemen
 Miracle on 34th Street
 Molly: An American Girl on the Home Front
 Mom's Got a Date with a Vampire
 Monster House
 Monte Carlo
 Mr. Popper's Penguins
 Mrs. Doubtfire
 Muppets from Space
 Muppets Most Wanted
 My Dog Skip
 My Scene Goes Hollywood
 Nacho Libre
 Nancy Drew
 Nanny McPhee
 Nanny McPhee and the Big Bang
 National Treasure
 National Treasure: Book of Secrets
 New York Minute
 Nim's Island
 Now and Then
 Old Dogs
 One Direction: This Is Us
 One Direction: Where We Are – The Concert Film
 Opposite Day
 ParaNorman
 Passport to Paris
 Penelope
 Percy Jackson & the Olympians: The Lightning Thief
 Percy Jackson: Sea of Monsters
 Peter Pan
 Phoebe in Wonderland
 Picture This
 Pirates of the Caribbean: The Curse of the Black Pearl
 Pizza My Heart
 Pollyanna
 Popeye
 Princess
 Princess Protection Program
 Prom
 Race to Witch Mountain
 Radio Rebel
 Rags
 Raise Your Voice
 Raising Helen
 Raising Izzie
 Ramona and Beezus
 Read It and Weep
 Recipe for Disaster
 Red Dog
 Red Riding Hood
 Return to Halloweentown
 Richie Rich
 Rip Tide
 R.L. Stine's Monsterville: Cabinet of Souls
 Robosapien: Rebooted
 Roxy Hunter and the Mystery of the Moody Ghost
 Roxy Hunter and the Secret of the Shaman
 Roxy Hunter and the Myth of the Mermaid
 Roxy Hunter and the Horrific Halloween
 RV
 Sabrina Goes to Rome
 Sabrina, Down Under
 Samantha: An American Girl Holiday
 Santa Buddies
 Santa Who?
 School of Rock
 Scooby-Doo
 Scooby-Doo 2: Monsters Unleashed
 Scooby-Doo! The Mystery Begins
 Scooby-Doo! Curse of the Lake Monster
 Scott Pilgrim vs. the World
 Sharpay's Fabulous Adventure
 She's the Man
 Shorts: The Adventures of the Wishing Rock
 Shredderman Rules
 Skyrunners
 Sleepover
 Smart Cookies
 Smart House
 Snow Dogs
 Snowmen
 Snow Buddies
 Snow White: The Fairest of Them All
 So Undercover
 Soccer Mom
 Son of Rambow
 Sorority Wars
 Space Buddies
 Space Jam
 SpaceCamp
 Spectacular!
 Speed Racer
 Spider-Man
 Spider-Man 2
 Spider-Man 3
 Spy Kids
 Spy Kids 2: The Island of Lost Dreams
 Spy Kids 3-D: Game Over
 Spy Kids: All the Time in the World
 Starstruck
 Stepsister from Planet Weird
 Stick it
 Stormbreaker
 Stuart Little
 Stuart Little 2
 Stuck in the Suburbs
 Superbabies: Baby Geniuses 2
 Swing Vote
 Swiss Family Robinson
 Teen Beach Movie
 Teen Beach 2
 Teen Spirit
 The Addams Family
 The Addams Family Values
 The Adventures of Rocky and Bullwinkle
 The Adventures of Sharkboy and Lavagirl in 3-D
 The Baby-Sitters Club
 The Cat in the Hat
 The Chaperone
 The Cheetah Girls
 The Cheetah Girls 2
 The Cheetah Girls: One World
 The Chronicles of Narnia: The Lion, the Witch and the Wardrobe
 The Chronicles of Narnia: Prince Caspian
 The Chronicles of Narnia: The Voyage of the Dawn Treader
 The Clique
 The Country Bears
 The Dog Who Saved Christmas
 The Dog Who Saved Easter
 The Dust Factory
 The Even Stevens Movie
 The Extraordinary Adventures of Adèle Blanc-Sec
 The Flintstones
 The Fox and the Child
 The Game Plan
 The Golden Compass
 The Goonies
 The Haunted Mansion
 The Karate Kid
 The Karate Kid Part II
 The Karate Kid Part III
 The Karate Kid (2010)
 The Last Airbender
 The Last Day of Summer
 The Little Rascals
 The Little Rascals Save the Day
 The Little Vampire
 The Lizzie McGuire Movie
 The Luck of the Irish
 The Mighty Ducks
 D2: The Mighty Ducks
 D3: The Mighty Ducks
 The Most Wonderful Time of the Year
 The Muppets
 The Muppet Christmas Carol
 The Muppets Take Manhattan
 The Muppets' Wizard of Oz
 The Pacifier
 The Paper Brigade
 The Parent Trap
 The Perfect Man
 The Polar Express
 The Princess Diaries
 The Princess Diaries 2: Royal Engagement
 The Santa Clause
 The Santa Clause 2
 The Santa Clause 3: The Escape Clause
 The Secret Garden
 The Seeker
 The Shaggy Dog
 The Simpsons Movie
 The Sorcerer's Apprentice
 The Spiderwick Chronicles
 The Spy Next Door
 The Ultimate Christmas Present
 The Velveteen Rabbit
 The Water Horse: Legend of the Deep
 The Wild Stallion
 Thugaboo: Sneaker Madness
 Thunderbirds
 Tooth Fairy
 Tooth Fairy 2
 Tru Confessions
 True Confessions of a Hollywood Starlet
 Twitches
 Twitches Too
 Two Brothers
 Under the Mountain
 Underdog
 Up, Up and Away
 Vampire Dog
 Wendy Wu: Homecoming Warrior
 What a Girl Wants
 When in Rome
 Where the Wild Things Are
 Wild Child
 Winning London
 Wizards of Waverly Place: The Movie
 Zathura: A Space Adventure
 Zoom

See also
 DigitAlb
 Television in Albania

References

External links
Official Website
Channel and transponder list

Digitalb television networks
Mass media in Tirana
Television channels and stations established in 2005
Children's television networks
Television stations in Kosovo